A leadership election for ANO 2011 was held on 28 February 2015. Incumbent Andrej Babiš was re-elected when he received votes from all 186 delegates. Only one vote was invalid.

Conduct
ANO 2011 is often called an undemocratic party, with the leadership election considered to be evidence of this. Some commentators and political rivals of ANO 2011 compared the vote to North Korean elections, noting a 100% result is something unique in democracy.

Results

References

ANO 2011 leadership elections
ANO 2011 leadership election
ANO 2011 leadership election
Single-candidate elections
Indirect elections
Elections in Prague
ANO 2011 leadership election
ANO 2011 leadership election